Bulloo Downs may refer to:
 Bulloo Downs, Queensland, a locality in the Shire of Bulloo, Queensland, Australia
 Bulloo Downs Station, a pastoral station in Queensland, Australia
 Bulloo Downs Station (Western Australia), a pastoral station in Western Australia